Lycée Bonaparte is a French international school in Doha, Qatar. It includes levels maternelle (preschool) through lycée (senior high school).

The École Française de Doha was established in a rented villa in Slata Al Jadida in the 1970s. The school had a temporary decline during the Gulf War because many families left Qatar. The school rebounded as the school moved into new premises, designed in an Arab-Islamic style and leased on behalf of the French Embassy in Qatar. The school was designated a high school around that time.

References

External links
 Lycée Bonaparte

French international schools in Qatar
Schools in Doha